US Post Office-Canton is a historic post office building located at Canton in St. Lawrence County, New York. It was designed and built in 1936–1937, and is one of a number of post offices in New York State designed by the Office of the Supervising Architect of the Treasury Department, Louis A. Simon.  The building is in the Colonial Revival style and is a one-story, nine bay steel framed structure clad in red brick in a trapezoidal shape. It features a multi-tiered cupola on its low hip roof.  The interior features a relief sculpture executed in 1939 by Berta Margoulies.

It was listed on the National Register of Historic Places in 1988.

References

Canton
Colonial Revival architecture in New York (state)
Government buildings completed in 1937
Buildings and structures in St. Lawrence County, New York
National Register of Historic Places in St. Lawrence County, New York